Thakurpura is a village in Shivpuri district of Madhya Pradesh state of India.

References

Villages in Shivpuri district